The 1960 United States presidential election in Minnesota took place on November 8, 1960 as part of the 1960 United States presidential election. Voters chose 11 electors, or representatives to the Electoral College, who voted for president and vice president.

Minnesota was won by the Democratic Party candidate U.S. Senator John F. Kennedy of Massachusetts won the state over incumbent Vice President Richard Nixon by a margin of 22,018 votes, or 1.42%. Kennedy went on to win the election nationally, but by the closest margin since James Garfield's 0.11% victory over Winfield Scott Hancock in 1880. This was the last presidential election held in Minnesota before the elimination of the 9th congressional district in 1963. It was also the last time Mower County voted for a Republican presidential candidate until Donald Trump in 2016. This marks the last time heavily populated Hennepin County voted for a candidate who lost the state as a whole.

Results

Results by county

See also
 United States presidential elections in Minnesota

References

1960
Min
1960 Minnesota elections